Adventure Creek is a stream in North Slope Borough, Alaska, in the United States. It is a tributary of the Utukok River.

Adventure Creek was named in 1925 when a group of surveyors became lost at the creek.

See also
 List of rivers of Alaska

References

Rivers of North Slope Borough, Alaska
Rivers of Alaska